Sacubitrilat (INN; or LBQ657) is the active metabolite of the antihypertensive drug sacubitril, which is used in the treatment of heart failure.

References

Antihypertensive agents
Biphenyls
Carboxylic acids
Amides